Lashkar-e-Balochistan (also LeB) is a militant group based in Pakistan's Balochistan province, which is agitating for Balochistan's national independence. The LeB became publicly known in 2012 after it claimed responsibility for several bombings in Lahore, Karachi and Quetta, killing or injuring several people. The group is currently inactive.

Designation as terrorist organization
In August 2012, the Pakistani government designated LeB as a terrorist group.

Allegations of foreign support
Pakistan has repeatedly accused India of supporting the Baloch militant groups in order to destabilize the country. India has categorically denied the allegation, stating that no concrete evidence has been provided.

References

Organisations designated as terrorist by Pakistan
Baloch nationalist militant groups
Balochistan
Paramilitary organisations based in Pakistan
Rebel groups in Afghanistan
Rebel groups in Pakistan
Separatism in Pakistan
Terrorism in Pakistan